Zyatkova Rechka is a rural locality (a selo) and the administrative center of Zyatkovo-Rechensky Selsoviet, Khabarsky District, Altai Krai, Russia. The population was 646 as of 2013. It was founded in 1860. There are 12 streets.

Geography 
Zyatkova Rechka is located 45 km southeast of Khabary (the district's administrative centre) by road. Poperechnoye is the nearest rural locality.

References 

Rural localities in Khabarsky District